Rappaport is an Ashkenazi surname, with the individuals bearing it being descendants of the Rabbinic Kohenic Rappaport family. Variants of the name include Rapaport, Rapa Porto, Rappeport, Rappoport and Rapoport.

Rappaport 
 Alfred Rappaport (diplomat) (1868–1946), Austrian diplomat and writer
 Alfred Rappaport (economist) (b. 1932), American economist
 Andrew S. Rappaport (b. 1957), American Silicon Valley venture capitalist
 Ben Rappaport (b. 1986), American television actor
 Bruce Rappaport (1922–2010), Palestinian-born international banker and financier
 Daniel Rappaport (b. 1970), American film producer
 David Rappaport (1951–1990), English actor
 David Rappaport (designer) (1914–2010), American fashion manufacturerer, designer, artist
 Edward Rappaport (b. ca. 1957), acting director of the U.S. National Hurricane Center
 Emil Stanisław Rappaport (1877–1965), Polish Supreme Court judge
 Herbert Rappaport (1908–1983), Austrian-born screenwriter and film director (known as Gerbert Rappaport in USSR)
 Helen Rappaport (b. 1947), English actress, author, historian
 Jerome Lyle Rappaport (b. 1927), American attorney and civic figure in Massachusetts
 Jill Rappaport (b. 1964), American author, journalist, television personality
 Jim Rappaport (b. 1956), American real estate developer in Massachusetts
 Kurt Rappaport (b. ca. 1958), American real estate developer
 Mark Rappaport (b. ca. 1942), American film director
 Mark Rappaport (creature effects artist) (b. 1954), American special-effects specialist
 Mat Rappaport (b. 1971), American artist, curator, educator
 Ray Rappaport (1922–2010), American scientist in cell biology
 Roy Rappaport (1926–1997), American anthropologist
 Ruth Rappaport (1923–2010), German-born American librarian (U.S. Library of Congress)
 Samuel Rappaport (1932–2016), American political figure in Pennsylvania
 Saul Rappaport (b. ca. 1940), American physics professor at MIT
 Sheeri Rappaport (b. 1977), American television actress
 Solomon Anski, Yiddish writer (born Solomon Zangwill Rappaport, Rappoport)
 Summer Rappaport (b. 1991), American professional triathlete
 Theodore Rappaport (b. 1960), American electrical engineer and professor

Rappoport 

 Boris Rappoport, Russian professional football coach
 Charles Rappoport, Russian naturalized French politician and intellectual
 Julius Rappoport, Russian silversmith
 Kseniya (Xenia) Rappoport, Russian actress
 Shloyme Zanvl Rappoport, known by his pseudonym S. Ansky (or An-sky)—a Russian Jewish author, playwright, researcher of Jewish folklore, polemicist, and cultural and political activist.

Rapaport 

 Alexandra Rapaport (b. 1971), Swedish film and stage actress
 Amir Rapaport (b. 1970), Israeli journalist, media personality
 David Rapaport (psychologist) (1911–1960), Hungarian-born U.S. (Kansas, Massachusetts) psychologist
 Eldar Rapaport (b. ca. 1970), Israeli film director
 Martin Rapaport (b. 1952), Belgian-American diamond dealer
 Matilda Rapaport (1986-2016), Swedish skier
 Michael Rapaport (b. 1970), U.S. actor, media personality
 Rosemary Rapaport (1918–2011), English musical educator
 Rudolf Ray Rapaport (1891–1984), Latvian-born international artist
 William J. Rapaport (b. ca. 1945), U.S. educator (New York)

Rapoport 

 Aaron Rapoport (b. 1954), American photographer
 Abraham Rapoport (Schrenzel) (1584–1651), Polish Talmudic scholar
 Adam Rapoport (b. 1969), former editor-in-chief of Bon Appétit magazine
 Alek Rapoport (1933–1997), Ukrainian-born U.S. artist
 Amos Rapoport (b. 1929), Polish-born professor of architecture
 Anatol Rapoport (1911–2007), Russian-born U.S. mathematical psychologist and game theorist
 Bernard Rapoport (1917–2012), American businessman, entrepreneur, philanthropist
 Chaim Rapoport (b. 1963), British rabbi, author, educator
 Dan Rapoport (b. ca. 1964), Latvian-born American international financier and philanthropist
 David C. Rapoport (b. 1929), American political scientist, specializing in terrorism
 Eda Rapoport (1890–1968), Latvian-born American composer, musical conducator, pianist
 Eduardo H. Rapoport (b. 1927), Argentinian ecologist
 Henry Rapoport (1918–2002), American chemist
 I. C. Rapoport (b. 1937), American photojournalist and screenwriter
 Ian Rapoport (b. 1980), U.S. sports journalist, media personality
 Ingeborg Rapoport (1912–2017), Cameroon-born German pediatrician and neonatologist
 Isaac ha-Kohen Rapoport, 18th century rabbi
 Leo Port (Rapoport; changed on arrival to Australia) (1922–1978), Polish-born Lord Mayor of Sydney 1975–1978
 Lev Pavlovich Rapoport (1920–2000), Russian nuclear physicist
 Louis Rapoport (b. 1942), U.S.-born Israeli newspaper editor
 Michael Rapoport (b. 1948), German mathematician
Miles S. Rapoport (b. 1949), American politician and nonprofit executive
 Nathan Rapoport (1911–1987), Polish-born sculptor
 Paul Rapoport (1940–1987), American attorney, gay-rights advocate
 Paul Rapoport (music researcher) (b. 1948), Canadian musicologist, music critic, composer and professor at McMaster University in Hamilton, Ontario
 Samuel Mitja Rapoport (1912–2004), Russian-born German physician, biochemist, and communist
 Solomon Judah Loeb Rapoport (1786–1867), Galician Jewish rabbi and scholar
 Sonya Rapoport (1923–2015), American artist, computer-artistry pioneer
 Tom Rapoport (b. 1947), German-born U.S. cell biologist at Harvard Medical School
 Vladimir Rapoport (1907–1975), Soviet cinematographer

See also 
 Rapoport's rule, an ecological hypothesis
 16180 Rapoport, a main-belt asteroid

Jewish surnames